The 1991 German Formula Three Championship was a multi-event motor racing championship for single-seat open wheel formula racing cars that held across Europe. The championship featured drivers competing in two-litre Formula Three racing cars which conform to the technical regulations, or formula, for the championship. It commenced on 31 March at Zolder and ended at Hockenheim on 28 September after eleven rounds.

Volkswagen Motorsport driver Tom Kristensen became a champion. He won three races and scored another four podium finishes to clinch the championship title. Marco Werner finished as runner-up, winning on Diepholz Airfield Circuit. Marc Hessel was victorious at Norisring, completing the top-three in the drivers' championship. Frank Krämer, Klaus Panchyrz, Peter Kox and Wolfgang Kaufmann were the other race winners. Mathias Arlt clinched the B-Cup championship title.

Teams and drivers
{|
|

Calendar

Results

Championship standings

A-Class
Points are awarded as follows:

References

External links
 

German Formula Three Championship seasons
Formula Three season